The Rans S-16 Shekari is an American single-engined, two-seat, low-wing, aerobatic monoplane designed by Randy Schlitter, built by Rans Inc and sold as a kit for amateur construction.

Design and development
Conceived as a new generation of Rans aircraft focusing on quicker built times and higher performance, the Shekari is stressed for dual aerobatics.

The Shekari has a 4130 steel tube-and-fabric forward fuselage with composite covering and 6061-T3 aluminum tube rear fuselage and tail. It is available as either a tail wheel landing gear or tricycle landing gear versions. The wings are removable by one person in ten minutes for storage or trailering.

Construction time claimed is 600 to 1500 man-hours, depending on builder experience.

Production of the S-16 was ended as part of Rans' extensive reorganization of its product line on 1 June 2006, after the kit had been available for 8 years. Twenty-two had been completed and flown by the end of 2005.

Specifications

References

Notes

Bibliography

External links
Official website archive on Archive.org
Photo of an S-16 Shekari

1990s United States civil utility aircraft
Homebuilt aircraft
S-016 Shekari
Aerobatic aircraft
Low-wing aircraft
Aircraft first flown in 1994